Selenia aurea, the golden selenia, is a flowering plant in the mustard family (Brassicaceae). It is endemic to the southern United States where it grows in sunny prairies, barrens, and glades of Arkansas, Kansas, Missouri, and Oklahoma. It flowers between March and May.

References

Brassicaceae
Endemic flora of the United States
Flora without expected TNC conservation status